Jerry Patterson may refer to:

 Jerry E. Patterson (born 1946), former Commissioner of the General Land Office of Texas
 Jerry L. Patterson (fl. 1970s–2000s), American author of five gambling related books
 Jerry M. Patterson (born 1934), American politician from California

See also
Jeremy Patterson (born c. 1985), perpetrator of the Sandy, Utah attack
Gerald Patterson (1895–1967), tennis player